Heart 2 Heart is a 2010 Indonesian drama film written by Tittien Watimena and directed by Nayato Fio Nuala with stars Irish Bella, Aliff Ali, Arumi Bachsin, Wulan Guritno, Indah Permatasari, Argatama Levi, and Miradz.

Plot
Starting with an accidental meeting at a lake, Pandu (Aliff Ali) and Indah (Irish Bella) find happiness in the beautiful forests, tea gardens, and lakes of Bogor. Finally, Indah's family vacation ends and she returns to Jakarta. They are reunited but some obstacles still exist in the form of Indah's boyfriend – chosen by her mother (Wulan Guritno). Then a tragic accident occurs that changes Indah's life as she can no longer see and speak, and her sister returns to help take care of her. Feeling lost and hopeless, Indah goes into solitude. Pandu, searching for his love, leaves school and attempts to return Indah's smile to her face. It is there at the lake where they first met that they reunite.

References

2010 drama films
2010 films
Indonesian teen drama films
Films shot in Indonesia
2010s teen drama films
Films scored by Melly Goeslaw
Films scored by Anto Hoed
Indonesian teen romance films
Films directed by Nayato Fio Nuala